Mighty Blue Angels Football Club is a club based in Monrovia, Liberia. They won the second division championship in their first season after promotion.

Achievements
Liberian Premier League: 0
Liberian Cup: 1
 2002

Performance in CAF competitions
CAF Cup Winners' Cup: 1 appearance
2003 – disqualified in First Round

Current squad

Football clubs in Liberia
Sport in Monrovia